Richard Frazier Elmore (died February 2021) was the Gregory R. Anrig Research Professor of Educational Leadership in the Harvard Graduate School of Education, where he taught for 24 years commencing in 1990. Professor Elmore was known for his modes of learning framework, and instructional rounds.

Selected bibliography

References

External links 

 

2021 deaths
Harvard Graduate School of Education faculty
Michigan State University faculty
University of Washington faculty
Harvard Graduate School of Education alumni
American educational theorists
Year of birth missing
Place of birth missing
Date of birth missing
Place of death missing
Date of death missing